Viala may refer to:

 "Viala", an alternate name of the Chasselas wine grape variety
 French ship Viala (1795), a ship-of-the-line of the French Navy

Places 
 Calmels-et-le-Viala, Aveyron department, France
 Viala-du-Pas-de-Jaux, Aveyron department, France
 Viala-du-Tarn, Aveyron department, France

People with the surname 
 Alain Viala (1947–2021), professor of French literature
 Joseph Agricol Viala (1780–1793), child hero in the French Revolutionary Army
 Pierre Viala (1859–1936), French scientist

See also 
 Vialas, Lozère department, France